Jajan (also Romanized as Jājān; also known as Dzhodzhan and Gūzan) is a village in Ozomdel-e Shomali Rural District, in the Central District of Varzaqan County, East Azerbaijan Province, Iran. At the 2006 census, its population was 772, in 188 families.

References 

Towns and villages in Varzaqan County